Taras Lazarovych (born 22 April 1982) is a Ukrainian forward.

External links

1982 births
Living people
Ukrainian footballers
Ukrainian Premier League players
FC Zirka Kropyvnytskyi players
FC Metalurh Zaporizhzhia players
FC Zorya Luhansk players
Ukrainian expatriate footballers
Expatriate footballers in Russia
FC Mordovia Saransk players
Ukrainian expatriate sportspeople in Russia
FC Zhemchuzhyna Odesa players
Association football forwards
Sportspeople from Zakarpattia Oblast